Katie Feeney (born August 16, 2002) is an American social media personality best known for her content on  social media app TikTok. Her content primarily consists of college, lifestyle, unboxing, vlogging, and sports media content. As of March 2023, she has gained over 7 million followers on the platform, along with over 3 million subscribers on YouTube, nearly a million followers on Instagram, and over one million subscribers on Snapchat. She has served as the social media correspondent for the Washington Commanders since April 2022.

Early life
Feeney attended Sherwood High School in Olney, Maryland where she served as the school’s SGA treasurer, along with running track. Her father is a deputy state's attorney, while her mother is an event planner. She is the youngest of three children, having two older brothers. Before her social media career, she had been competitively dancing since the age of four.

Career

Rise to Popularity on Social Media
Feeney first began posting to TikTok when it was still known as Musical.ly in 2015.
She continued to create content throughout high school, amassing 2 million TikTok followers when the Coronavirus pandemic started in 2020. During the pandemic, she began posting videos on the growth of sea monkeys and unboxing videos. In February 2021, she made national headlines when she made over one million dollars using Snapchat's "Spotlight" feature within six weeks of posting content, something that had never been done before in Snapchat's history. 
In February 2023, she was selected to be a tester for a new Instagram feature, called "Broadcast Channels" along with celebrities such as Chloe Kim, Mikaela Shiffrin, FaZe Rug, and Valkyrae.

Penn State
Feeney enrolled at Penn State University in the fall of 2021, studying Broadcast Journalism in hopes of starting her own podcast or talk show. She began producing more lifestyle oriented content, focusing on the life of a college student. She also works with the Penn State Football team, along with the school's other sports, to provide social media content. Feeney has also used her platform to fundraise for the school's "THON" fundraiser, which raises money for children fighting cancer at Penn State Health Children's Hospital.

Washington Commanders
On April 13, 2022, Feeney was hired as the first ever “Commanders Social Media Correspondent” by the Washington Commanders. This marked the first time in NFL history that a social media personality partnered with an NFL team. As part of the partnership, Feeney provides exclusive team coverage to her followers, with the goal of connecting them and other fans to the organization. During the 2022 NFL season, she covered the draft party, rookie minicamp, training camp, media day, and select home games.

White House/AKSM Media
On November 28, 2022, Feeney was hired as the White House social media correspondent for AKSM Media. Feeney will provide her followers with coverage of White House events, as well as expanding White House reporting via social media. AKSM's goal for Katie is to connect a younger audience to the White House and limit the spread of misinformation on social media. On her first day on the job, she began posting content covering First Lady Jill Biden's 2022 Christmas decorations at the White House.

Public image
Feeney is known as a "Campus Celebrity" at Penn State. Maddie Tyler of AKSM News (Feeney’s employer) described Feeney as: "A pioneer in the social media industry where she has been able to create a sustaining career that is putting her through college." Sam Gutelle of Tubefilter credited Feeney with "continuing to bridge the gap between short-form video and sports reporting."

Personal life
Feeney has been in a relationship with Virginia Tech baseball player Jack Hurley since early 2022. She previously dated Sean Yamada.

References

Living people
2002 births
Washington Commanders personnel
People from Olney, Maryland
American TikTokers
American YouTubers
Social media influencers
Pennsylvania State University alumni